Carol Ann Klein  (born 24 June 1945) is an English gardening expert, who also works as a television presenter and newspaper columnist.

Early life
Born in Walkden, Lancashire, in 1945, Klein attended Bolton School but left school when she was 15. Interviewed for Lancashire Life in 2014 she recalled: "I think I was quite close to being chucked out. I loved art and biology but in those days you had to choose between the two subjects. I was fed up about that." She wanted to go to art school but her father would not allow it and she ended up selling buttons and stockings at the Kendal Milne department store in Manchester. Her love of gardening was inspired partly by her grandfather, whose allotment she enjoyed, and partly by her mother.

Klein trained as an art teacher and taught in schools in Shepherd's Bush, London before moving to Devon. There she lectured at North Devon College and taught art at South Molton Secondary School and Community College before setting up her own plant nursery, Glebe Cottage Plants. She  exhibited at more than 200 Royal Horticultural Society shows and began exhibiting at the annual Chelsea Flower Show in 1990, where her displays won a total of six gold medals.

Television
Klein made her television debut on Gardeners' World in 1989 and has since presented other gardening programmes such as Real Gardens and Open Gardens.

Projects include Life in a Cottage Garden with Carol Klein which followed a year in the life of Klein's garden at Glebe Cottage in North Devon, and Grow Your Own Veg. Each week the programme looked at a different group of crop plants or techniques suitable for home gardening. Both programmes were made for BBC Two. She has been a permanent presenter of Gardeners' World since 2005.

Klein has been described as having a "weather-beaten face, forthright manner and fruity accent – mainly West Country but with hints of her native Manchester.."

In 2013 she was a joint presenter for two episodes of BBC's Great British Garden Revival.

Writing
As well as television work, Klein has written a number of best-selling books for Mitchell Beazley and writes for gardening publications such as BBC Gardeners' World magazine as well as a column for The Guardian. She writes a weekly column, syndicated through the Trinity Mirror regional's newspaper publishing business, which appears in the "Saturday Extra" magazine given with regional newspaper titles such as the Liverpool Echo and Manchester Evening News.

Personal life
Klein is married to Neil Klein and has two daughters, Annie and Alice. Annie lives in California and Alice lives in Lewisham and has two children.  
In 2011 Klein's nursery business, Glebe Cottage Plants, based at her home at Chittlehamholt near Umberleigh, which took orders from all over the UK, was forced to close after a dispute with her neighbour.

In 2016 she was voted the nation's favourite gardener in a poll for Yorkshire Women's Life Magazine over her Gardener's World colleague Monty Don.

In March 2018 Klein was awarded the Victoria Medal of Honour by the Royal Horticultural Society.

Bibliography
Plant Personalities: Choosing and Growing Plants by Character with Jonathan Buckley (Cassell Illustrated, 2004) 
RHS Grow Your Own Veg (Mitchell Beazley, 2007) 
RHS Grow Your Own Fruit (Mitchell Beazley, 2008) 
RHS Grow Your Own Veg Journal (Mitchell Beazley, 2008) 
Cook Your Own Veg (Mitchell Beazley, 2008) 
Making a Garden (Mitchell Beazley, 2015)

References

External links

 
 A firm favourite – article in The Guardian, 28 July 2007
 Portrait by Tessa Traeger at the National Portrait Gallery, London (2002)
 Life in a Cottage Garden – BBC television programme
 Biography and career at curtisbrown.co.uk

1945 births
Living people
People from Walkden
People educated at Bolton School
English gardeners
English garden writers
English television presenters
English television personalities
Television personalities from Lancashire